Kenneth Ragan (born September 12, 1950) is an American stock car racing driver. Now retired, he formerly competed in the NASCAR Winston Cup Series, and is the father of driver David Ragan.

Career
Ragan made 50 Cup starts from 1982 to 1990, mostly for his brother Marvin, but also drove in the 1985 season for Roger Hamby. Ragan's best finish was an 11th place that he recorded at Talladega Superspeedway in 1984. He also made five Busch Series starts in 1982 and 1983. Ragan's 1984 No. 77 Cup car is sometimes featured in stills from the 1984 Firecracker 400, as he was the lapped car directly ahead  of Richard Petty and Cale Yarborough in their battle for victory. He was the last driver to win at Middle Georgia Raceway.

Personal life
Ragan travels with his son to his races and has served as his manager. He formerly worked at David Ragan Ford, a car dealership owned for several years by his son in Perry, Georgia.

Ragan is a type 1 diabetic, which he was diagnosed with in the 1970s.

Motorsports career results

NASCAR
(key) (Bold – Pole position awarded by qualifying time. Italics – Pole position earned by points standings or practice time. * – Most laps led.)

Winston Cup Series

Daytona 500

Late Model Sportsman Series

ARCA Permatex SuperCar Series
(key) (Bold – Pole position awarded by qualifying time. Italics – Pole position earned by points standings or practice time. * – Most laps led.)

References

External links
 

Living people
1950 births
People from Dooly County, Georgia
Racing drivers from Georgia (U.S. state)
NASCAR drivers